Uzunpınar is village in the Adıyaman District, Adıyaman Province, Turkey. Its population is 433 (2021).

The hamlet of Gözecik is attached to the village.

References

Villages in Adıyaman District

Kurdish settlements in Adıyaman Province